Quriqucha (Quechua quri gold, qucha lake, "gold lake", Hispanicized spelling Ccoricocha) is a lake in Peru. It is situated in the Apurímac Region, Andahuaylas Province, San Jerónimo District. Quriqucha lies southwest of the lakes Antaqucha and Wachuqucha, and northeast of the lake Suyt'uqucha.

See also
List of lakes in Peru

References

Lakes of Peru
Lakes of Apurímac Region